Popovica (Cyrillic: Поповица) is a small neighborhood of Sremska Kamenica, Serbia. It is located on the edge of the urban area of Novi Sad and National Park of Fruška Gora. Popovica is connected to Sremska Kamenica and Novi Sad by public bus No.74.
It is also the name of the nearby Mt. Popovica.

See also 
Fruška Gora Marathon

References 

Novi Sad neighborhoods